Philippe Parrot (born 13 May 1831 in Excideuil, died 1894) was a French painter.  A street in Périgueux is named after him.

Selected works
 Elegy, oil on canvas, 148 x 106 cm, 1868, Bordeaux, Musée des Beaux-Arts
 Bacchante, oil on canvas, 98.5 x 174.8 cm, 1892, Ghent, Musée des Beaux-Arts
 Allegory, oil on canvas, 191 x 95, 1880, Ghent, Musée des Beaux-Arts

Sources
 Famous Pictures Reproduced from Renowned Paintings by the World's Greatest Artists, Chicago: Stanton and Van Vliet, 1917, p. 185
 Clara Erskine Clement Waters and Laurence Hutton, Artists of the Nineteenth Century and Their Works: A Handbook Containing Two Thousand and Fifty Biographical Sketches, Boston: Houghton, Osgood, 1879, p. 164
 Cyclopedia of Painters and Paintings, Ed. John Denison Champlin and Charles Callahan Perkins, 4 vols., Volume 3, New York: Scribner, 1887, p. 398
 Clara Harrison Stranahan, A History of French Painting from its Earliest to its Latest Practice: including an account of the French academy of painting, its salons, schools of instruction and regulations, New York: Scribner, 1888, p. 362

1831 births
1894 deaths
19th-century French painters
French male painters
People from Dordogne
19th-century French male artists